Cremastocheilus castaneae is a species of scarab beetle in the family Scarabaeidae.

Subspecies
These four subspecies belong to the species Cremastocheilus castaneae:
 Cremastocheilus castaneae brevisetosus Casey, 1915
 Cremastocheilus castaneae castaneae Knoch, 1801
 Cremastocheilus castaneae lecontei Westwood, 1874
 Cremastocheilus castaneae pocularis Casey, 1915

References

Further reading

 

Cetoniinae
Articles created by Qbugbot
Beetles described in 1801